Inglese is an Italian surname, literally meaning "English" or "from England". Notable people with the surname include:

Anna Inglese, 15th-century Italian singer
Cathy Inglese (1958–2019), American women's basketball coach
Guglielmo Inglese (1892–1962), Italian actor, voice actor, radio personality and playwright
Judith Inglese, American artist
Roberto Inglese (born 1991), Italian footballer
Veronica Inglese (born 1990), Italian long-distance runner

See also
Ingles (surname)

Italian-language surnames
Toponymic surnames
Ethnonymic surnames